Since the election of 27 April 1994, South Africa has been divided into nine provinces. They vary widely in size, from the Northern Cape, which covers nearly one-third of the country's land area, to Gauteng, which takes up a mere 1.5%.

The Prince Edward Islands, which are considered part of the Western Cape for legal purposes but are administered by the national Department of Environmental Affairs, are not included in this table; they have surface areas of 290 km² (Marion Island) and 45 km² (Prince Edward Island).

Historical data

The provincial borders have changed twice since 1994: once on 1 March 2006, when all provinces except the Free State and the Western Cape were affected; and once on 3 April 2009, when only the Gauteng–North West border was altered.

The pre-2006 figures are based on a less accurate calculation, and therefore the total is different from that for the post-2006 figures.

References

area
South African provinces by area
provinces by area
South African provinces